This is a list of notable alumni and instructors of the School of Visual Arts.

Notable alumni

Animation
Aaron Augenblick (1997) – founder and manager of Augenblick Studios in Brooklyn, New York
Jerry Beck – animation historian
John R. Dilworth (1985) – creator of Courage the Cowardly Dog
Derek Drymon (1992) – storyboard artist and writer on Rocko's Modern Life and creative director on SpongeBob SquarePants
Jeremy Goldberg (2016) – creator, animator
Tom Herpich (2002) – writer, storyboard artist, and character designer on Adventure Time
Ian Jones-Quartey (2006) – creator of OK K.O.! Let's Be Heroes
Chris Niosi (2011) – animator, voice actor
 Michael Paraskevas (1984) — artist best known for creating Maggie and the Ferocious Beast with his mother Betty Paraskevas
Bill Plympton (1969) – twice Academy Award-nominated animator
Chris Prynoski (1994) – animator, founder of Titmouse, Inc.
Pres Romanillos (1989) – supervising animator at Disney and DreamWorks animation
 Mike Roth (1999) - creative director and supervising producer on Regular Show
 Phil Rynda (2003) - director of creative leadership at Netflix Animation and lead character designer on Adventure Time
Carlos Saldanha (1993) – director of the films Rio and Ferdinand
Rebecca Sugar (2009) – creator of Steven Universe
Dana Terrace (2012) - creator of The Owl House
Daisuke Tsutsumi (1998) – concept artist and art director at Pixar
Vivienne Medrano (2014) - creator of Hazbin Hotel and Helluva Boss

Cartooning (by decade)

1940s 
Ross Andru (mid-to-late 1940s) – comic book illustrator and editor for DC and Marvel
Mike Esposito (mid-to-late 1940s) – comic book illustrator (inker) DC, Marvel, Archie Comics
 Ric Estrada (late 1940s) — Cuban American comics artist who worked for companies including DC Comics
 Bill Gallo (late 1940s) — sports cartoonist and columnist 
Wally Wood (attended 1948) – creator of MAD, Weird Science, Shock SuspenStories, Wally Wood's T.H.U.N.D.E.R. Agents, Witzend, Power Girl

1950s 
 Gene Bilbrew (early 1950s) — cartoonist and "bizarre art" pioneer
Steve Ditko (c. 1952) – co-creator of Spider-Man, creator of The Question and others
 Tom Feelings (early-to-mid-1950s) – pioneering African American cartoonist and children's book artist
 Stan Goldberg (late 1950s) — longtime artist for Archie Comics
Archie Goodwin (mid-1950s) – longtime editor and writer for Marvel and DC
 Larry Ivie (1950s) — comics artist, writer, and collector who was active in comics fandom in the middle part of the 20th century, described by comics historian Bill Schelly as "the closest thing to an authority on comics that was available in the 1950s." 
 Dick Hodgins Jr. — (early 1950s) cartoonist whose work included illustration, comic strips, and political cartoons
 Nick Meglin (mid-1950s) — writer, humorist, and artist known for his contributions to Mad
Tom Moore (c. 1950) – Archie cartoonist, writer, letterer
Joe Sinnott (c. 1950) – longtime Marvel Comics inker
 Eric Stanton (early 1950s) — underground cartoonist and fetish art pioneer
 Tony Tallarico (early 1950s) — comic book artist, children's book illustrator, and author

1960s 
Sal Amendola (1969) — DC Comics, Archie Comics. Penciler, inker, writer, production, editor, talent coordinator; primarily known for writing, drawing Batman.
 Liz Berube (1961) — romance comic artist for DC in the 1970s
 Herb Trimpe (c. 1960) — comics artist best known as the seminal 1970s artist on The Incredible Hulk and as the first artist to draw for publication the character Wolverine
 John Verpoorten (early 1960s) — comic book artist and editorial worker best known as Marvel Comics' production manager

1970s 
Peter Bagge (1977) – alternative cartoonist
 Ray Billingsley (1979) — cartoonist, creator of the syndicated comic strip Curtis
 Joey Cavalieri (1979) — comics writer and editor
 Bo Hampton (mid-1970s) — comic book and cartoon artist
John Holmstrom (mid-1970s) – founder of PUNK magazine; co-founder of Comical Funnies with Peter Bagge; creator of Bosko, "America's Least Favorite Cartoon Character"
Kaz (late 1970s) – underground cartoonist known for his strip Underworld
 Ken Landgraf (1970s) — comic book artist, inker, and self-publisher
 Keith Haring (late 1970s) – artist and social activist
 Patrick McDonnell (1978) — cartoonist, author, and playwright, known as the creator of the daily comic strip Mutts
 Tim Sale (attended late 1970s) — Eisner Award-winning comics artist primarily known for his collaborations with writer Jeph Loeb
 Alex Saviuk (1974) — comics artist primarily known for his work on Spider-Man
 Mark Texeira (late 1970s) — comic book artist and painter
 Bob Wiacek (1974) — comic book inker

1980s 
Kyle Baker (c. 1985) – graphic novelist and animator
 Mark Bodé (attended 1982) — cartoonist, son of underground comix creator Vaughn Bodē
 Jon Bogdanove (mid-1980s) — comic book writer/artist known for his work on Power Pack and Superman: The Man of Steel
 Jerry Craft (1984) — cartoonist and children's book illustrator best known for his syndicated newspaper comic strip Mama's Boyz and his graphic novel New Kid
Matt Davies (late 1980s) – Pulitzer Prize-winning political cartoonist
Bob Fingerman (c. 1986) – alternative/underground cartoonist and creator of Minimum Wage and White Like She
Drew Friedman (1981) – alternative cartoonist/illustrator known for his celebrity caricatures
Rob Gilbert (late 1980s) – children's illustrator, animator, cartoonist, known for The Adventures of Ranger Rick
 Mike Harris (c. 1983) — comic book artist active in the 1980s and 1990s
 Glenn Head (1985) — comic book artist and editor
Jamal Igle (late 1980s) – DC Comics artist of Firestorm, Nightwing, Supergirl and Zatanna
 Katharine Kuharic (c. 1985) – figurative painter and educator
 Marisa Acocella Marchetto (c. 1983) — graphic memoirist known for Cancer Vixen
Mark Newgarden (1982) – underground cartoonist and creator of the Garbage Pail Kids
Joe Quesada (1984) – comic book illustrator, editor-in-chief and later Chief Creative Officer of Marvel Comics; majored in illustration
 Dwayne Turner (c. 1989) – comic book and storyboard artist, video game concept illustrator

1990s 
Chris Batista (early 1990s) – comic book artist on Legion of Superheroes and 52
 Tony Consiglio (c. 1993) — alternative cartoonist
 Farel Dalrymple (late 1990s) — alternative cartoonist
 Nelson DeCastro (early 1990s) — comic book artist and illustrator
Dennis Detwiller (early 1990s) – comic book artist, collectible card game illustrator (Magic: The Gathering) and video game designer (Scarface: The World is Yours)
Jordan B. Gorfinkel (early 1990s) — DC Comics editor, Batman
 Sam Henderson (1991) — alternative cartoonist known for his humorous work
Phil Jimenez (1991) – DC Comics writer/artist for Wonder Woman; artist for Infinite Crisis
John Paul Leon (early 1990s) – comic book illustrator known for work on Earth X, Static
 Shawn Martinbrough (early 1990s) — comic book illustrator known for his work on Robert Kirkman's Thief of Thieves
 Alitha Martinez (mid-1990s) — comic book artist on Iron Man, Black Panther: World of Wakanda
 Alex Robinson (1993) — cartoonist best known for his graphic novel Box Office Poison
 James Sturm (MFA, 1991) — alternative cartoonist and co-founder of the Center for Cartoon Studies
Gerard Way (1999) – lead singer of My Chemical Romance (2001–2013; 2019–present); artist of The Breakfast Monkey; author of The Umbrella Academy

2000s 
 Josh Adams (2009) — comic book and commercial artist, son of comics artist Neal Adams
 Ulises Fariñas (c. 2005) — comic book artist who has worked on Godzilla, Judge Dredd, and Transformers (dropped out of SVA)
 Jess Fink (2003) — alternative cartoonist known for her erotic comics 
 Tomer Hanuka (2000) — Israel-American cartoonist and illustrator
 Christopher Hastings (2005) — American comics writer and artist
James Jean (2001) — cover artist for the comic book series Fables and The Umbrella Academy, for which he has won six Eisner Awards for "Best Cover Artist"
 Sabrina Jones (MFA, 2003) – activist comics artist, painter, and editor
 Nate Powell (2000) — award-winning cartoonist; illustrator of the March trilogy of non-fiction graphic novels
 Khary Randolph (2000) — comic book artist for Marvel Comics, Epic Comics, DC Comics, Aspen Comics, Image Comics, and Boom! Studios
 Koren Shadmi (mid-2000s) — Israeli-American illustrator and cartoonist
 Dash Shaw (2005) — alternative cartoonist and animator
 Raina Telgemeier (2002) — best-selling author of middle grade and YA graphic novels
 Sara Varon (2002) — cartoonist and illustrator known for her work for children

2010s 
 Molly Ostertag (2014) — cartoonist and writer known for her webcomic Strong Female Protagonist and her middle grade graphic novel series The Witch Boy, The Hidden Witch, and The Midwinter Witch

Computer art
Louisa Bertman – animated shorts
Laurence Gartel – digital art pioneer
Nikita Mikros – independent game designer

Film and video
Martin Ahlgren – cinematographer
Fred Armisen – actor, comedian, writer and Saturday Night Live cast member; did not graduate
Andrew Bowser – co-director and star of The Mother of Invention
Sam Brown – comedian and founding member of the sketch comedy troupe The Whitest Kids U' Know
Steve Carr – film director, Paul Blart: Mall Cop, Daddy Day Care, Next Friday, Are We Done Yet?
David Caspe – creator of the ABC hit show Happy Endings; screenwriter, That's My Boy; graduated from SVA in 2005 with an MFA
Zach Cregger – comedian and member of the sketch comedy troupe The Whitest Kids U' Know
Michael Cuesta – director of L.I.E.
Bennett Elliott – producer of Procession
Randall Emmett – film producer, Rambo, Iron Man; former personal assistant to Mark Wahlberg; graduated SVA in 1995 with a BFA in Film and Video
Michael Giacchino – film composer
Craig Gillespie – film and commercial director; Lars and the Real Girl, Mr. Woodcock, and Fright Night; has been directing commercials for over a decade
Ranbir Kapoor – Actor, Assistant Director, Producer; attended workshop; did not graduate 
Rahul Khanna – Indian actor
Robert Kolodny – director of Pep and cinematographer of Procession
Jared Leto – film actor (Requiem for a Dream, Lord of War, Fight Club, Dallas Buyers Club); attended SVA for a BFA in Film and Video, during which time he directed and starred in short film Crying Joy; director of music videos for his band Thirty Seconds to Mars: "The Kill", "From Yesterday", "Kings and Queens", "Closer to the Edge", "Hurricane" under the alias of Bartholomew Cubbins, and "A Beautiful Lie" under the alias of Angakok Panipaq
 Joe Lipari — comedian, artist, activist. His award winning short film "Dream Job" led to a series of dream jobs, most notably leading the creative departments for the Brooklyn Nets and New York Islanders.
Trevor Moore – comedian and founding member of the sketch comedy troupe The Whitest Kids U' Know
Geoffrey Notkin – science writer, art director, producer, and host of Meteorite Men and STEM Journals
Mika Orr – documentary filmmaker
 Kal Parekh – actor
Joseph M. Petrick – writer and co-director of The Mother of Invention
Jonathan Pontell – Emmy, Golden Globe, and George Foster Peabody Award winning television director, producer and editor
Jesse Richards – painter, Remodernist filmmaker and founder of U.S. Stuckism center
Andrew Rona – film producer and studio executive; former co-president of Rogue Pictures; president of Silver Pictures; produced Unknown, Scary Movie 3, Scream 2, Scream 3, Project X
Carlos Saldanha – director and co-director of Ice Age, Robots, Ice Age: The Meltdown, and Rio; his films have grossed over $2.6 billion worldwide; according to Box Office Mojo, he is the 38th most successful director of all time based on box office gross
Harris Savides – cinematographer of the films Last Days, Elephant, Gerry, Zodiac, and Milk
Marc Scarpa – pioneering digital media producer/director; Town Hall with President Clinton, The X Factor Digital Experience, VidBlogger Nation
 Robert J. Sexton - producer, director, writer, and former musician
Mike Silbowitz – Video Game Marketing & Publishing Veteran, Currently Head of Americas Business Division for Krafton
Bryan Singer – film director, attended SVA for two years before transferring to the USC School of Cinematic Arts in Los Angeles
Kazuhiro Soda – director of observational documentaries Campaign, Mental, and Peace
Dante Tomaselli – film director of Anchor Bay Entertainment's Satan's Playground
Morten Tyldum – Norwegian director of Headhunters and The Imitation Game
Ti West – director of the horror comedy The Roost and Cabin Fever 2

Fine arts
Devon Dikeou – artist, editor, publisher, collector
Kesewa Aboah – painter and visual artist
Esao Andrews – painter and skateboard designer
Ali Banisadr – painter and drawer
Samuel Bayer – music video and commercial director, cinematographer, and visual artist; directed 2010 remake of A Nightmare on Elm Street; graduated SVA with a Bachelor of Fine Arts in 1987
Robert Beauchamp – painter
Tom Burr – installation artist
Robin Byrd – adult film actress; took art and sketching classes at SVA; did life form modeling to help pay for classes
Rosson Crow – painter
Inka Essenhigh – painter
Neck Face – graffiti artist
Charles Fazzino - 3D pop artist
Andrea Fraser – performance artist
Pamela Fraser – painter
Barnaby Furnas – painter
Jedd Garet – sculptor, painter, and printmaker
Rita Genet – painter
Kate Gilmore – multimedia artist
Keith Haring – attended, but was expelled when he used the interior of an SVA building as a canvas for graffiti in a project with Jean-Michel Basquiat
Jane Hart – curator and gallerist
Gus Heinze – painter
Reverend Jen – performance artist
Vashtie Kola, also known as Vashtie or Va$htie – director, designer, artist, blogger, party promoter
Joseph Kosuth – conceptual artist
Tina La Porta—digital artist
Robert Lazzarini – sculptor and installation artist
Dinh Q Lê – fine arts photographer
Sol LeWitt – artist working in multiple media
Jennifer Macdonald – conceptual artist
Donald Martiny – painter
Mark McCoy – print artist and photographer, notable for releasing on Heartworm Press
Aleksandra Mir – artist
Steve Mumford – painter
Paul A. Paddock – painter
Elizabeth Peyton – painter
Andrew Cornell Robinson – multimedia artist
Jorge Luis Rodriguez – painter, sculptor, mixed-media artist
Brian Rutenberg – painter
Kenny Scharf – painter
Jeff Sonhouse (BFA 1998) – painter
Sarah Sze – sculptor and MacArthur Fellows Program ("Genius Grant") recipient
Bradley Theodore — visual artist
John von Bergen – sculptor
Charlie White – artist, working primarily in photography

Graphic design
Gail Anderson – partner at Anderson Newton Design; faculty at SVA; former senior art director of Rolling Stone
Jimmy DiResta – maker, graphic designer
Todd Radom – designer of logos for professional sports teams and leagues
Rus Yusupov – graphic and visual designer; Internet entrepreneur; co-founder of Vine and HQ Trivia apps

Illustration
Federico Castelluccio – painter; Italian-born actor, known for portraying Furio Giunta on the HBO series The Sopranos
Paul Brooks Davis – illustrator
R. Gregory Christie - author and illustrator of children's books
Tomer Hanuka – illustrator
Yuko Shimizu – illustrator
Yumi Heo - author and illustrator of children's books
Madeline Zuluaga - author and illustrator of children's books

Music
Chantal Claret – founding member and lead singer of Morningwood
Aurelio Voltaire, also known as Voltaire – animator and comic artist, artist of "BRAINS!", a song written for the Cartoon Network show The Grim Adventures of Billy and Mandy in the episode Little Rock of Horror
Jared Leto – lead singer and co-founder of alternative rock band Thirty Seconds to Mars; actor; film director
Mark McCoy – influential hardcore punk frontman, notable for Charles Bronson and Das Oath
Gerard Way – lead singer and co-founder of alternative rock band My Chemical Romance; writer of comic book The Umbrella Academy
Michael Giacchino - Academy Award winning Film Composer; notable for The Incredibles, Up, and Medal of Honor
Alan Robert- Illustrator and bassist for New York City metal band Life of Agony

Photography
David Attie – photographer
Michael Avedon – photographer
Alison Brady – photographer
David Carol – photographer
Renée Cox – artist, photographer
Nona Faustine – artist, photographer
Ina Jang – photographer
Simen Johan – artist, photographer
Noah Kalina – art and editorial photographer
Justine Kurland – fine art photographer
David LaChapelle – photographer
Olivia Locher – photographer
Janelle Lynch – landscape photographer
Matuschka – artist, photographer
Yamini Nayar — photographer, sculptor
Signe Pierce – photographer
Lorna Simpson – artist
Amy Stein – photographer
Daniel Traub – photographer, filmmaker
Shen Wei – artist, photographer
Romulo Yanes – photographer

Visual narrative
Louisa Bertman – illustrator, animated shorts, animated gifs, film, computer art, visual narrative

Other
Camillo Mac Bica – philosopher, author, activist
John Bollinger – author, financial analyst, hedge fund manager, inventor of Bollinger Bands
Manuel DeLanda – philosopher and writer
Mark Kendall – artist and filmmaker; won a Guggenheim Fellowship in 2014
Sheila Lukins – cook and food writer who co-authored The Silver Palate series of cookbooks and The New Basics Cookbook
Jon Lung – product designer, graphic designer and co-host of the TV series Mythbusters (MFA Products of Design, 2016)
Adrian Piper – conceptual artist and philosopher; won a Guggenheim Fellowship in 1989
Jeff Provenzano – skydiver
Mark Ulano – production sound mixer, Inglorious Basterds, Django Unchained, Titanic
Spider Webb – tattoo artist

Notable faculty

Animation
Aurelio Voltaire – musician, animator, author and artist

Art history
Amy Taubin - author and film critic, contributing editor for BFI Sight & Sound and Film Comment 
Mel Bochner – conceptual artist
Thyrza Nichols Goodeve
Leandro Katz – conceptual artist and filmmaker
Donald Kuspit – author of numerous books, including The Cult of the Avant-Garde Artist; The Dialectic of Decadence
Robert C. Morgan – art critic
Jerry Saltz – former head art critic, Village Voice; currently writes for New York

Cartooning
Jessica Abel – graphic novelist, La Perdida
Sal Amendola – comic book artist primarily associated with DC Comics
 Nick Bertozzi – cartoonist, author of many graphic novels
 Joey Cavalieri — comic book writer/editor
 Nelson DeCastro — comic book writer and illustrator
Will Eisner – comics creator whose SVA courses inspired his books Comics & Sequential Art and Graphic Storytelling & Visual Narrative
Tom Gill – Dell Western cartoonist, noted for the Lone Ranger
 Bill Griffith — creator of Zippy the Pinhead
Tom Hart – cartoonist, writer, Hutch Owen
Carmine Infantino – writer and editor during the silver age of comic books
Klaus Janson – veteran of several Batman comics, including The Dark Knight Returns, Batman: Black and White, and Batman: Gothic
Phil Jimenez – illustrator on Wonder Woman, New Xmen, Countdown to Infinite Crisis, JLA-Titans, Planetary/Authority
Harvey Kurtzman – cartoonist, editor, and founding editor of Mad magazine
 Jason Little — cartoonist known for Shutterbug Follies and Motel Art Improvement Service
Matt Madden – cartoonist/writer known for works such as Odds Off and the comics-making textbook Drawing Words and Writing Pictures
Jack Markow – cartoonist, originator of the course in magazine cartooning
Rick Marschall – writer-editor, Nemo, the Classic Comics Library
 Alitha Martinez — comic book artist
David Mazzucchelli – illustrator of Batman: Year One; creator of Asterios Polyp
 Josh Neufeld, nonfiction cartoonist
Joe Orlando – artist-editor, vice president of DC Comics, associate publisher of Mad
Gary Panter – cartoonist, writer, Jimbo in Purgatory
Walter Simonson – worked on Thor and X-Men-related comics
Art Spiegelman – comics artist, editor and advocate for the medium of comics, best known for his Pulitzer Prize-winning graphic novel memoir, Maus
J. David Spurlock – award-winning illustration & cartooning author-historian, creator rights advocate, longtime associate of Jim Steranko, Frank Frazetta, Neal Adams, Carmine Infantino and director of the Wallace Wood Estate
Bhob Stewart – comics for The Realist, Charlton, DC, Marvel and Warren Publishing
 Sara Varon — teaches printmaking
Sam Viviano – contributor and art director at Mad magazine
 Lauren Weinstein — cartoonist, author of Inside Vineyland, Girl Stories, and The Goddess of War

Fine arts
Richard Artschwager – sculptor and designer
Alice Aycock – creator of large, architectural sculptures; solo exhibitions, including at the Museum of Modern Art
John Bageris – painter
Robert Beauchamp – painter
Lynda Benglis – innovator of materials in the 1970s; feminist icon
Ronald Bladen – sculptor 
David Budd – painter
John Button – painter
Dan Christensen – painter
Chuck Close – painter
Michael Goldberg – painter
Eva Hesse – sculptor
Chaim Koppelman – printmaker, created the Printmaking Dept. at SVA (1959) where he taught until 2007
Joseph Kosuth – conceptual artist
Ronnie Landfield – painter
Thomas Lanigan-Schmidt – artist
Sol LeWitt – artist
Michael Loew – painter
Robert Mangold – painter
Brice Marden – painter
Keith Milow – artist
Marilyn Minter – exhibitions include Salon 94 (NY), Whitney Biennial 2006
Elizabeth Murray – painter
Joseph Nechvatal – digital art and theories of virtual reality
Steve Poleskie – screen printing
Joseph Raffael – painter
Jane Rosen – sculptor and painter
Carolee Schneemann – artist
Barbara Schwartz – artist
Joel Shapiro – sculptor
James Siena – artist
Marjorie Strider – sculptor
Jack Whitten – painter
Hannah Wilke – artist, sculptor, founder of SVA Ceramics Program
Neil Williams – painter
Larry Zox – painter

Graphic design
Ed Benguiat – calligrapher and type designer; created over 600 typeface fonts, such as Barcelona and Bookman; designed the logos for The New York Times, Playboy, and Sports Illustrated; teaches typography
Jimmy DiResta – graphic designer; host of Hammered with John and Jimmy DiResta, Against the Grain, Dirty Money, and Trash to Cash
Bob Gill – designer, founding partner of the design agency that would turn into Pentagram, and co-creator of Beatlemania musical
Milton Glaser – designer who created the famous "I love NY" logo
Steven Heller – co-founder of the school's MFA "Designer as Author" program
KAWS, born Brian Donnelly – graffiti artist, limited-edition clothing and toy designer
Debbie Millman – partner and president of the design division at Sterling Brands
Stefan Sagmeister – award-winning graphic designer
Paula Scher – graphic designer and principal at the Pentagram design consultancy; created redesigns of the Citibank and Tiffany brands; her work is featured in the Museum of Modern Art and the Cooper-Hewitt, National Design Museum
James Victore – independent graphic designer
Rus Yusupov – designer and co-founder of Vine (service) and HQ Trivia

Illustration
Barbara Nessim - artist and illustrator
Ray DiPalma – poet and visual artist
James McMullan – illustrator and designer
John Sheridan – poster artist and magazine cover illustrator
Robert Weaver – pioneering illustrator of the 50s
George Woodbridge – illustrator known for his exhaustive research and historical accuracy, with exacting expertise in drawing military uniforms

Photography
Guy Aroch – photographer, BFA photography department professor
Marco Breuer – photographer
Elinor Carucci – photographer, BFA photography department professor
Laurel Nakadate – video artist, photographer, BFA photography department professor
Stan Shaffer – photographer
Amy Stein – photographer
Amy Taubin – film critic, former curator of video and film at The Kitchen, MFA Photography Video and Related Media department
Jerry Yulsman – photographer (Playboy, Collier's, Look) and novelist (Elleander Morning)

Filmmaking
Roy Frumkes – screenwriter and independent filmmaker
Bob Giraldi – director and independent filmmaker
Manfred Kirchheimer – documentary filmmaker, director of Stations of the Elevated and We Were So Beloved.
Chris Newman – sound engineer; three-time Academy Award winner and five-time nominee; sound mixer and director; The Godfather, Amadeus, The Exorcist, The Silence of the Lambs, and The English Patient
Lew Schwartz, founder of film department; former Batman artist; Emmy Award-winning filmmaker
Amy Taubin – curator, film critic and filmmaker (Film Comment, Millennium Film Journal, Artforum, Premiere, L.A. Weekly, Sight and Sound, The Village Voice)

MFA computer art
Lillian Schwartz – visiting scholar

References

School of Visual Arts
People